A runaway train is an uncontrolled train.

Runaway train or Runaway Train may also refer to:

Music 
 "The Runaway Train" (Vernon Dalhart song), 1925
 "The Runaway Train", a 1956 cover of the Vernon Dalhart song by Michael Holliday, popular on children's radio in the UK.
 "Runaway Trains", a song by Tom Petty and the Heartbreakers from Let Me Up (I've Had Enough), 1987
 "Runaway Train" (Rosanne Cash song), 1988
 "Runaway Train" (Elton John and Eric Clapton song), 1992
 "Runaway Train" (Soul Asylum song), 1992
 "Runaway Train", a song by Geddy Lee from My Favourite Headache album, 2000
 Runaway Train (Kid Galahad EP), 2001, or the title song
 Runaway Train (Oleander EP), 2002, or the title song
 "Runaway Train", a song by Jamie Scott and the Town, 2007
 Runaway Train (Crabb Revival album), 2008, or the title song
 "Runaway Train", a song by Avantasia from The Wicked Symphony album, 2010
 "Runaway Train", a song by Brad Paisley from Wheelhouse, 2013

Other uses 
 Runaway Train (film), 1985
 Runaway Train (roller coaster), an amusement ride at Chessington World of Adventures, London
 The Runaway Train, an audiobook based on the TV series Doctor Who
 "Runaway Train", a 2001 episode of Johnny Bravo
 "Runaway Train", an episode of Seconds From Disaster, about the Gare de Lyon rail accident in Paris

See also 
 Runaway Mine Train (disambiguation)